Shauna Shim (born 28 March 1979) is an American-born English actress.

Early life
Shim was born in Miami, Florida, United States to her African-American mother and Chinese father. She is of African-American and Chinese descent. When Shim was 10 years old, her family moved from United States to England in 1989. Shim was raised in Nottingham, England, and trained at the Carlton Television Workshop alongside other actors such as Samantha Morton, Toby Kebbell, Vicky McClure and award-winning director, Julian Kemp. Her brother, Andrew Shim, is also an actor, whom she has been quoted as saying she would "love to work with".

Career
Having worked extensively in film, television and on the West End stage, Shim has appeared alongside many world-renowned actors such as Nicole Kidman, Simon Pegg, David Schwimmer, Chiwetel Ejiofor, Paul Bettany, Sam Rockwell, Freema Agyeman, James Caan, Donald Sutherland and Lauren Bacall. Her film work has covered various genres including horror (An American Haunting, 2005), comedy (Big Nothing, 2006), Independent Arthouse (Dogville, 2003).

Shim has also appeared in numerous television series and dramas, including the British drama series A Thing Called Love, with Paul Nicholls; the US TV series The Embassy; the Irish drama-series Legend, with Padraic Delaney and Miss Drill in a children's TV series (The Worst Witch, 2017–20).

Filmography
Big Nothing - Melanie
Legend – Victoria 
Holby City – Ruth Evans
An American Haunting – Anky 
A Thing Called Love – Chantelle Staple 
Doctors – Joanna Parks 
Piccadilly Jim – Pett House Maid
Dogville – June 
Octane – Paramedic 
Crossroads – Philomena Wise 
This Little Life – Nurse Janey 
The American Embassy – Gwen
The Worst Witch – Miss Drill
Biff and Chip - Mrs Page

Stage
Worker's Writes – Royal Court Theatre
Cadillac Ranch – Soho Theatre
Splash Hatch On The E Going Down – Donmar Warehouse Theatre
Four – Royal Court Theatre

References

External links

Leftlion interview
BBC interview

1979 births
Actresses from Miami
Actresses from Nottinghamshire
American actresses of Chinese descent
American emigrants to England
American film actresses
American television actresses
English film actresses
English people of African-American descent
English people of Chinese descent
English television actresses
Living people
Actors from Nottingham
20th-century American actresses
20th-century English actresses
21st-century American actresses
21st-century English actresses
American stage actresses
English stage actresses